Jesse Smit (born 23 August 1996) is a South African first-class cricketer. He was included in KwaZulu-Natal's squad for the 2016 Africa T20 Cup.

References

External links
 

1996 births
Living people
South African cricketers
KwaZulu-Natal cricketers
Place of birth missing (living people)